Kolinio Sivoki (born 10 March 1995) is a Fijian footballer who plays as a defender for Lautoka.

International career
In 2017, Sivoki was called up by coach Juan Carlos Buzzetti for the Fiji national football team. He made his debut on August 27, 2015, in a 6–0 win against American Samoa. Sivoki played the whole 90 minutes. He scored his first and so far his only goal on May 28, 2017 in a 1-0 win against the Solomon Islands.

International goals
Scores and results list Fiji's goal tally first.

References

External links

Living people
1995 births
Association football midfielders
Fiji international footballers
Fijian footballers
Suva F.C. players
Lautoka F.C. players
2016 OFC Nations Cup players